Cancilla larranagai is a species of sea snail, a marine gastropod mollusk in the family Mitridae, the miters or miter snails.

Description

Distribution

References

 Cernohorsky W. O. (1991). The Mitridae of the world (Part 2). Monographs of Marine Mollusca 4.
 Rios, E.C. (1994) Seashells of Brazil. 2nd Edition. Fundaçao Cidade do Rio Grande, Fundaçao Universidade do Rio Grande, Museu Oceanográphico, Rio Grande, RS, XII, Rio Grande, Brazil, 368 pp., 113 pls.
 Salisbury R. & Huang S.-I. (2015). Notes on Cancilla isabella (Swainson, 1831) (Neogastropoda: Mitridae) with emphasis on the radula and generic assignment within Mitridae. Visaya. 4(4): 29-41

External links
  Simone L. R. L. & Cunha C. M. (2012) Taxonomic study on the molluscs collected in Marion-Dufresne expedition (MD55) to SE Brazil: Xenophoridae, Cypraeoidea, mitriforms and Terebridae (Caenogastropoda). Zoosystema 34(4): 745-781

Mitridae
Gastropods described in 1947